Nokia Fastlane is a user interface from Nokia, used on the Nokia Asha platform and Nokia X platform. Fastlane is the timeline of your activities in your phone. You can access Fastlane in Asha OS by swiping left or right from the Start screen. The first device to run Fastlane is Nokia Asha 501.

Usage
Fastlane has an Facebook's "What's On Your Mind" Feature. It also has an "Upcoming Events" Feature.

Compatible With
Nokia Asha Software Platform
 Nokia Asha Software 1.0
 Nokia Asha Software 1.1
 Nokia Asha Software 1.2

Nokia Lumia

Nokia X platform
 Nokia X Software 1.0.1
 Nokia X Software 1.1.1
 Nokia X Software 1.1.2.2
 Nokia X Software 2.0

Compatible Phones
Nokia
 Nokia Asha 230
 Nokia Asha 500
 Nokia Asha 501
 Nokia Asha 502
 Nokia Asha 503
 Nokia X(1st Version)
 Nokia X+
 Nokia XL
 Nokia X2 (2014)

See also
Nokia
Nokia Asha 501
Nokia Asha platform
Nokia X

Graphical user interfaces